Highway 301 is an American 1950 film noir written and directed by Andrew L. Stone, and starring Steve Cochran, Virginia Grey, Gaby André and Edmon Ryan.

Plot
A gang of career criminals, modeled on the real life Tri-State Gang, are terrorizing and robbing banks and payrolls in North Carolina, Virginia and Maryland. George, the gang's leader, is a cold killer who does not distinguish between armed guards and any of the group's molls that cross him. The film starts with comments from then-governors of North Carolina, Virginia and Maryland about how crime doesn't pay.

By the film's end, all five of the gang members and two of their three molls are depicted as dead, with the last moll arrested while impersonating a reporter during an attempt to aid George and Bobby in killing a moll who could incriminate them all.

Cast
 Steve Cochran as George Legenza
 Virginia Grey as Mary Simms
 Gaby André as Lee
 Edmon Ryan as Detective Sgt. Truscott and the film's narrator
 Robert Webber as William B. 'Bill' Phillips
 Wally Cassell as Robert 'Bobby' Mais
 Aline Towne as Madeline Welton
 Richard Egan as Herbie Brooks
 Edward Norris as Noyes Hinton, gang driver
 Lyle Latell as Police Officer Murray

Reception

Box office
According to Warner Bros records the film earned $759,000 in the U.S. and $845,000 in other markets.

Critical response
When the film was first released, The New York Times critic Bosley Crowther caustically panned it, writing "The most disturbing and depressing of the many depressing things about the Strand's current Warner Brothers' shocker, Highway 301, is the fact that governors in Maryland, Virginia and North Carolina endorse this cheap gangster melodrama as an effective deterrent to crime. In forewords which are personally delivered by Maryland's lame-duck Governor Lane and by Virginia's and North Carolina's Governors Battle and Scott, respectively, these eminent and honorable officials convey the solemn idea that what you are about to see is something that will prove to you how profitless crime is...However, the whole thing, concocted and directed by Andrew L. Stone, is a straight exercise in low sadism. And the reactions at the Strand yesterday among the early audience, made up mainly of muscular youths, might have shocked and considerably embarrassed the governors mentioned above."

Film critic Dennis Schwartz gave the film a positive review in 2011, writing "Andrew Stone (Julie/Cry Terror!/The Steel Trap) effectively directs this enjoyable action-filled B film crime drama that wants us to know that 'crime doesn't pay.'"

References

External links
 
 
 
 
 Highway 301 informational site and DVD review at DVD Beaver (includes images)
 

1950 films
1950 crime drama films
American black-and-white films
American crime drama films
American drama road movies
Film noir
Films about bank robbery
Films directed by Andrew L. Stone
Films scored by William Lava
Films set in Maryland
Films set in North Carolina
Films set in Virginia
Warner Bros. films
1950s heist films
1950s drama road movies
American heist films
1950s English-language films
1950s American films